(Oumou Sy) (born 1952 in Podor, Senegal) is a Senegalese fashion designer frequently referred to as "Senegal's Queen of Couture".

She founded Metissacana, an association that supports the cultural and economic exchange between continents. She lives and works in Dakar and owns stores in Geneva and Paris.

She is one of Senegal's internationally known haute couture designers and her collections have been shown in fashion shows across Europe, Asia, Africa, and the U.S.  She designed the wardrobe for the Senegalese singers Baaba Maal and Youssou N'Dour, and has won various awards at international film festivals for her costume designs.

In 1998 Sy was one of the three African fashion designers to win the Principal Prince Claus Award; the other two were Tetteh Adzedu from Ghana and Alphadi from Mali.

References

 Sources consulted 

 
 
 

 Endnotes

External links
  Oumousy.com - Official website
  Comite International de soutien à Oumou Sy (International Support Committee for Oumou Sy) - Summary of 2001's jailing over a Libyan/Senegalese affair
 
  "Oumou Sy" at the French Wikipedia - large article, links to be scoured
 Oumou Sy | Love to know
 Smithsonian catalogue 

Senegalese fashion designers
1952 births
Living people
Senegalese women artists
Senegalese women fashion designers